Inge Heiremans is a Belgian football striker currently playing for KV Mechelen in the Belgian Second Division. She has also played for Rapide Wezemaal and K. Sint-Truidense VV (Belgian First Division), Lindenwood Lions and Jacksonville Dolphins (NCAA), FH (Úrvalsdeild), Tampa Bay Extreme (W-League), VfL Wolfsburg (Bundesliga) and KSK Heist (Super League). She first played the European Cup in 2006 with Rapide Wezemaal.

She is a member of the Belgian national team.

References

1981 births
Living people
Belgian women's footballers
Expatriate women's soccer players in the United States
Expatriate women's footballers in Germany
Expatriate women's footballers in Iceland
VfL Wolfsburg (women) players
Belgium women's international footballers
Jacksonville Dolphins women's soccer players
Lindenwood University alumni
Lindenwood Lions women's soccer players
Women's association football forwards
Inge Heiremans
Inge Heiremans
Sint-Truidense V.V. (women) players
Lierse SK (women) players
Belgian expatriate sportspeople in the United States
Belgian expatriate sportspeople in Germany
Belgian expatriate sportspeople in Iceland
Belgian expatriate women's footballers